Lyropupa microthauma is a species of gastropod in the Pupillidae family. This species is endemic to the United States.

References

Endemic fauna of the United States
Molluscs of Hawaii
Gastropods described in 1904
Lyropupa
Taxa named by César Marie Félix Ancey
Taxonomy articles created by Polbot